Piñeiro may refer to:

People
Eddy Piñeiro (born 1995), American football player
Graciela Piñeiro Uruguayan biologist and paleontologist
Ignacio Piñeiro (1888–1969), Cuban musician
Joel Piñeiro (born 1978), Puerto Rican baseball player
Manuel Piñeiro Losada (1933–1998), "Barba Roja", Cuban revolutionary, counter-intelligence, etc.
Markos Piñeiro Pizelli (born 1984), Brazilian footballer
Omar Pineiro (born 1997), American rapper known professionally as Smokepurpp

Places
 Piñeiro, Buenos Aires, Argentina

See also
Pinero (disambiguation)
Pinheiro (disambiguation)
Piñeyro (disambiguation)